Iekei ramen (家系ラーメン) is a variety of ramen featuring a pork marrow and soy sauce broth and thick, straight noodles that was first invented in Yokohama by the ramen shop Yoshimura-ya in 1974.  In Canada, Iekei ramen or Yokohama Iekei ramen has become famous with the incredibly popular Ramen Arashi located in Banff Alberta, Canmore Alberta and Victoria BC.

References 

Ramen dishes
Japanese cuisine